Robert Winkler  (born 24 January 1991) is an Austrian freestyle skier. He competed at the 2018 and 2022 Winter Olympics.

References

External links

1991 births
Living people
Austrian male freestyle skiers
Olympic freestyle skiers of Austria
Freestyle skiers at the 2018 Winter Olympics
Freestyle skiers at the 2022 Winter Olympics
People from Bruck an der Mur
Sportspeople from Styria